Turridrupa akhaiderensis is an extinct species of sea snail, a marine gastropod mollusk in the family Turridae, the turrids.

Description
The length of the shell attains 14 mm.

Distribution
This extinct marine species was found in Helvetian strata in the Cairo-Suez district, Egypt.

References

akhaiderensis
Gastropods described in 1977